Ay Petri yayla is a massif and regional nature reserve (zakaznik) located in Crimea, a region internationally recognised as part of Ukraine but occupied by Russia since 2014. It is one of the yaylas of the Crimean Mountains.

Description 
Ay Petri yayla, though it is a massif, is somewhat more plateau-like than other yaylas of the Crimean Mountains. As the yayla approaches the Southern Coast, it drops steeply. Like other yaylas, Ay Petri yayla has a limestone composition. 12.6% of its surface is covered by forests.

The reserve was declared due to the yayla's diversity of flora and fauna, as well as its underground wells which supply water to the nearby population. In addition to Ay Petri yayla itself, there are multiple nature reserves within the yayla, including the Grand Canyon of Crimea. The yayla is part of the Yalta Mountain-Forest Nature Reserve.

Environmental concerns regarding Ay Petri yayla have been particularly significant, with Anatoliy Hrytsenko calling on President Viktor Yushchenko to expand environmental protections to clear pollution on the mountain in 2007. In 2014, environmental activists protested plans by the government of Anatolii Mohyliov to expand recreational areas on the yayla, as well as for the removal of areas on the Southern Coast from the Yalta Mountain-Forest Nature Reserve.

References 

Crimean Mountains
Plateaus of Ukraine
Plateaus of Russia